Marian Wnuk (5 September 1906 – 29 September 1967) was a Polish sculptor. His work was part of the sculpture event in the art competition at the 1936 Summer Olympics.

References

External links
 

1906 births
1967 deaths
20th-century Polish sculptors
Polish male sculptors
20th-century male artists
Olympic competitors in art competitions
People from Radomsko County
Academy of Fine Arts in Gdańsk alumni